The Jody Grind is a 1966 recording by Horace Silver featuring both a quintet and a sextet. Released the following year on his longtime label Blue Note, it peaked No. 8 of the Billboard jazz album charts. As one of his "groove-centered" recordings it would "wind up as possibly the most challenging", Steve Huey writes on Allmusic, and gave "one of the most underappreciated" of Silver's albums 4½ stars.

Track listing
All tracks composed by Horace Silver
 "The Jody Grind" – 5:50
 "Mary Lou" – 7:09
 "Mexican Hip Dance" – 5:53
 "Blue Silver" – 5:59
 "Grease Piece" – 7:31
 "Dimples" – 7:17

Recorded on November 2 (#1, 3, 6) and 23 (#2, 4–5), 1966.

Personnel
Horace Silver – piano
Woody Shaw – trumpet
Tyrone Washington – tenor sax
James Spaulding – alto sax on tracks 2, 4, 5, flute solo on 2
Larry Ridley – bass
Roger Humphries – drums

References

Jody Grind, The
Horace Silver albums
Albums produced by Alfred Lion
Blue Note Records albums